Llavares is a parish in Santo Adriano, a municipality within the province and autonomous community of Asturias, in northern Spain. 

The population is 39 (2006). The postal code is 33115.

The Asturian people of this parish live in two villages:
 Cuatumonteros
 Llavares

Fiesta days include:
 "Feast of Flowers", the last Sunday of May
 San Antonio, 13 June

References

External links
 Asturian society of economic and industrial studies, English language version of "Sociedad Asturiana de Estudios Económicos e Industriales" (SADEI)

Parishes in Santo Adriano